Mission Accomplished may refer to:

 Mission Accomplished, a 2004 BBC documentary by Sean Langan
 Mission Accomplished (film), a short 1943 US propaganda film
 "Mission Accomplished" (The Wire), the 12th and final episode of the third season of the HBO original series, The Wire
 Mission Accomplished speech, a 2003 address given by US President George W. Bush
 Mission Accomplished ... But the Beat Goes On, a 1979 album by The Rezillos